Heathcote may refer to:

Places

in Australia
Heathcote, New South Wales, a suburb of Sydney
Electoral district of Heathcote, a seat in the New South Wales Legislative Assembly
Heathcote National Park
Parish of Heathcote a parish of Cumberland County
Heathcote, Victoria
Heathcote-Graytown National Park
Heathcote wine region
Heathcote Junction, Victoria
Heathcote South, Victoria
Point Heathcote, Western Australia

in Canada
 Heathcote Lake, Ontario

in England
 Heathcote, Ilkley, a villa in West Yorkshire
 Heathcote, Derbyshire
 Heathcote, Shropshire
 Heathcote, Warwickshire, a suburb of Leamington Spa

in New Zealand
 Heathcote Valley, a suburb of Christchurch
 Heathcote River
 Heathcote (New Zealand electorate)

in the United States
 Heathcote Community, Maryland
 Heathcote, New Jersey
 Heathcote Brook
 Withington Estate, also known as Heathcote Farm

People
as a forename
Heathcote Helmore (1894–1965), New Zealand architect
Heathcote Howard Hammer (1905–1961), Australian soldier
Heathcote Dicken Statham (1889–1973), British conductor and composer
Heathcote Williams (1941–2017), English poet, actor and playwright
Heathcote Williams (cricket administrator) (1859–1931), New Zealand cricket administrator

as a surname
Heathcote (surname)
Heathcote baronets, in the baronetage of Great Britain

Other
Heathcote Botanical Gardens, Florida
Heathcote School (disambiguation), several establishments

See also
Heathcoat-Amory baronets
Heathcott, a surname